Craterostigmus is a genus of centipedes belonging to the monotypic family Craterostigmidae.

The species of this genus are found in Australia and New Zealand.

Species:

Craterostigmus crabilli 
Craterostigmus tasmanianus

References

Centipedes
Centipede genera